The Van Buren Street Bridge is a bascule bridge that spans the Chicago River in downtown Chicago, Illinois, United States. It is the sixth bridge at this location and carrying this name, and was completed in 1956.  It replaced an 1895 Rolling Lift-type bascule bridge designed by William Scherzer.

References

External links

Bascule bridges in the United States
Bridges completed in 1956
Bridges in Chicago